Marilyn Maye McLaughlin (born April 10, 1928) is an American jazz singer, cabaret singer, and musical theater actress. She began her career as a young child, performing in Kansas in concerts and on the radio. After graduating from high school, she moved to Chicago, Illinois, where she drew the attention of Steve Allen, performing first on The Steve Allen Show and then The Tonight Show with Johnny Carson. She is the most frequently heard singer on the program, having appeared 76 times.

Maye recorded for RCA Victor during the 1960s, after which she has had a successful career as a cabaret singer. She has appeared on stage in musicals.

Career
Born Marilyn Maye McLaughlin in Wichita, Kansas, she began her career as a child, competing in amateur contests in Topeka, Kansas, where her father, a pharmacist, owned a drugstore. She was accompanied on piano by her mother, who named her after singer Marilyn Miller.

Maye began her musical training with her mother at the age of 3. At the age of 9 she began taking voice lessons with Rosamond Nyman in Topeka. In 1942, after her parents divorced, she moved with her mother to Des Moines, Iowa.

At age 14, while attending Amos Hiatt Junior High School, she sang for songwriters Hugh Martin and Ralph Blane. She was given a fifteen-minute radio show on KRNT in Des Moines. She graduated from East High School.

Moving to Kansas City, Missouri, she produced her first records locally. For nearly two decades, she worked as the primary soloist of Durrett Productions, a local jingle company. Together with her third husband, she worked engagements at the Colony Club for eleven years. There, she came to the attention of Steve Allen, who invited her to appear on his show; shortly after, she signed a recording contract with RCA Victor. She appeared on The Tonight Show 76 times and received a 1966 Grammy nomination for Best New Artist. Her version of the song "Cabaret" became a hit. In 1967, Maye recorded "Step to the Rear" from the musical How Now Dow Jones, which she later reprised as a commercial jingle for Lincoln Mercury. She also performed it in support of Iowa Governor Robert D. Ray and US Senator Bob Dole.

As supper club culture declined, she took on roles in theatre, including Mame, Can-Can, Follies, and Hello, Dolly. At 78, her career was revived in 2006 when she performed at Lincoln Center for the Mabel Mercer Foundation. In 2010, she performed at a Carnegie Hall concert in celebration of Stephen Sondheim's 80th birthday. She continues to sing in nightclubs nationwide, including Feinstein's/54 Below, at which she performs an annual birthday show. She also teaches clinics and masterclasses.

Since 1981, Billy Stritch has worked as Maye's off-and-on accompanist and music director.

Awards and honors
In 2008, she received a Distinguished Arts Award from the governor of Kansas. Other honors include the Jazz Heritage Award, the Kansas City Jazz Ambassador's Award of Excellence, the Elder Statesmen of Jazz Award, and lifetime achievement awards from both the Oklahoma Jazz Hall of Fame and Kansas City's CODA Jazz Fund.

She was given a lifetime achievement award by the American Jazz Museum and inducted into its Walk of Fame. She has also received lifetime achievement awards from the Great American Songbook Foundation, Licia Albanese-Puccini Foundation, and the Chicago Cabaret Professionals Association.

Her version of "Too Late Now" was included in the Smithsonian Institution recordings of the 20th Century. On September 18, 2012, the Native Sons and Daughters of Greater Kansas City honored Maye with the organization's Outstanding Kansas Citian Award.

Ella Fitzgerald referred to Maye as "the greatest white female singer in the world".

Personal life
Maye has been married three times. For nine years, she and her second husband ran a dance studio in Kansas City. Her third husband, pianist Sammy Tucker, accompanied her for over a decade. She has one daughter, Christy.

Discography

LP Albums
 Cool Sounds From Kansas City (1958)
 The Most (1961)
 Meet Marvelous Marilyn Maye (1965)
 The Second of Maye (1965)
 The Lamp Is Low (1966)
 A Taste of "Sherry!" (1967)
 Step to the Rear (1967)
 The Happiest Sound in Town (1968)
 Marilyn Maye, Girl Singer (1970)

Hit singles
 "Cabaret" (1966)
 "Sherry!" (1967)
 "When We All Get Together" (1967)
 "Step to the Rear" (1967)
 "Til You Come Back" (1968)
 "Feelin'" (1968)
 "Think Summer" with Ed Ames (1969)

CD Albums
 The Singing Side of Life
 Marilyn Maye Sings All of Jerry Herman's Hello Dolly (1985)
 Rapport: Marilyn Maye & Mark Franklin Communicate (2000)
 Sounds of Maye (2001)
 Maye Sings Ray (2005)
 Super-Singer – A Tribute to Johnny Carson (2005)

References

External links
 Official site
 

Living people
Actresses from Kansas
20th-century American actresses
20th-century American singers
20th-century American women singers
21st-century American actresses
21st-century American singers
21st-century American women singers
American women jazz singers
American jazz singers
American musical theatre actresses
Cabaret singers
RCA Records artists
Singers from Kansas
1928 births